Benniu East railway station is a reserved railway station of Shanghai–Nanjing Intercity High-Speed Railway located in Jiangsu, People's Republic of China.

Railway stations in Jiangsu